Klymenko is a Ukrainian surname that derived from the given name of Klym, which originated from the Latin Clement. Sometimes it is transliterated through Russian language as Klimenko and Belarusian as Klimenka.

 Aleksandr Klimenko (athlete) (1970–2000), Ukrainian shot putter
 Aleksandr Petrovich Klimenko, Russian scientist, inventor of refrigeration technique Kleemenko cycle
 Alyaksandr Klimenka (born 1983), Belarusian footballer
 Alyona Klimenko (born 1982), Kazakhstani water polo player
 Andrei Klimenko (born 1978), Russian footballer
 Anton Klimenko (born 1985), Russian footballer
 Artem Klimenko (born 1994), Russian basketball player
 Betty Klimenko (born 1959), Australian businesswoman
 Ganna Klymenko (born 1992), Ukrainian synchronized swimmer
 Gleb Klimenko (born 1983), Russian ice hockey player
 Ihor Klymenko (born 1972), Ukrainian police chief and acting Minister of Internal Affairs
 Larisa Klimenko (born 1949), Soviet gymnast
 Oleksandr Klymenko (disambiguation), multiple Ukrainian individuals
 Svitlana Stanko-Klymenko (born 1976), Ukrainian long distance runner
 Viktor Klimenko (disambiguation), multiple individuals
 Vladyslav Klymenko (born 1994), Ukrainian footballer
 Yelena Klimenko (born 1991), Kazakhstani handball player
 Yuriy Klymenko (born 1973), Ukrainian politician

See also
 
 

Ukrainian-language surnames
Surnames of Ukrainian origin